Rodrigo Sebastián Castillo (born 26 April 1998) is an Argentine professional footballer who plays as a defender for Acassuso.

Career
Castillo's career in senior football got going with Acassuso. He made the breakthrough into the club's first-team on 12 November 2018 in a Primera B Metropolitana fixture versus Fénix, featuring for the full duration of a 1–0 defeat at the Estadio Nueva España.

Career statistics
.

References

External links

1998 births
Living people
Place of birth missing (living people)
Argentine footballers
Association football defenders
Primera B Metropolitana players
Club Atlético Acassuso footballers